Landyia is a trilobite in the order Phacopida, that existed during the lower Ordovician in what is now Australia. It was described by Jell in 1985, and the type species is Landyia elizabethae. The type locality was the Digger Island Formation in Victoria.

References

External links
 Landyia at the Paleobiology Database

Pilekiidae
Phacopida genera
Fossil taxa described in 1985
Ordovician trilobites
Trilobites of Oceania